Lethrinops macrophthalmus is a species of cichlid endemic to Lake Malawi where it is known to occur in the Nkhotakota area.  It prefers habitats with patches of Vallisneria.  This species grows to a length of  SL.

References

macrophthalmus
Fish of Lake Malawi
Fish of Malawi
Fish described in 1908
Taxa named by George Albert Boulenger
Taxonomy articles created by Polbot